Allen Trovillion (May 1, 1926 – December 8, 2020) was an American politician who served as a member of the Florida House of Representatives from the 36th district.

Early life and education
Trovillion was born and raised in Winter Park, Florida. He served in the United States Army Air Corps during World War II. He later received his bachelor's degree in building construction from the University of Florida in 1950.

Career 
After graduating from college, Trovillion worked as a building contractor. From 1962 to 1967, he served as Mayor of Winter Park. He was elected to the Florida House of Representatives in 1994 and served until 2002.

Personal life 
He lived in Winter Park, Florida, with his family.

References

External links
Official Website of Allen Trovillion
Political Graveyard

University of Florida alumni
1926 births
2020 deaths
Republican Party members of the Florida House of Representatives
People from Winter Park, Florida